Black Sea shad is a common name for several fish in the genus Alosa which occur in the Black Sea and may refer to:

 Alosa immaculata
 Alosa maeotica
 Alosa tanaica